The Taitung Children's Story House is historical building in Taitung City, Taitung County, Taiwan.

History
The area used to be the dormitory and reception room of the Taiwan Tobacco and Liquor Corporation employees and chief since 1937. In 2003, the building and the surrounding area was handed over from the corporation to Taitung County Government for free. In 2005, the county government repaired and restored the area and turned into the Taitung Children's Story House in 2007. It was then given to Taitung County Family Education Center and handed over again to Taitung Story House Association in 2011.

Architecture
The main building is a Japanese-style building. It features slide, lawn, tree house and cat trail.

See also
 List of tourist attractions in Taiwan

References

2007 establishments in Taiwan
Buildings and structures completed in 1937
Buildings and structures in Taitung County